RoKi is a Finnish ice hockey team based at Lappi Areena (capacity 3,500), Rovaniemi.  Established in 1979. Full name of the club is Rovaniemen Kiekko.

Honours

Mestis
 Mestis (1): 2022

Suomi-sarja
 Suomi-sarja (2): 2011, 2013
 Suomi-sarja (1): 2009

Current team

External links

Rovaniemen Kiekko
Rovaniemen Kiekko
Mestis teams